is a Japanese footballer who plays for Fukushima United FC in J3 League.

Career statistics
Updated to 23 February 2018.

References

External links
Profile at Fukushima United FC 

Profile at AC Nagano Parceiro

1984 births
Living people
Ritsumeikan University alumni
Association football people from Kyoto Prefecture
Japanese footballers
J1 League players
J2 League players
J3 League players
Cerezo Osaka players
Shonan Bellmare players
Oita Trinita players
AC Nagano Parceiro players
Fukushima United FC players
Association football defenders